Statistics of Swedish football Division 2 for the 1973 season.

League standings

Norra

Södra

References
Sweden - List of final tables (Clas Glenning)

Swedish Football Division 2 seasons
2
Sweden
Sweden